Hasanabad-e Manqashali (also Romanized as Ḩasanābād-e Manqashalī and Ḩasanābād-e Manqasalī) is a village in Bizaki Rural District, Golbajar District, Chenaran County, Razavi Khorasan Province, Iran. At the 2006 census, its population was 34, in 10 families.

References 

Populated places in Chenaran County